The 2020 AFC Champions League Final was the final of the 2020 AFC Champions League, the 39th edition of the top-level Asian club football tournament organized by the Asian Football Confederation (AFC), and the 18th under the current AFC Champions League title.

The final was contested as a single match between Persepolis from Iran and Ulsan Hyundai from South Korea. Under the original format and schedule, the final would have been contested in two-legged home-and-away format, with the first leg played on 22 November 2020 and the second leg played on 28 November 2020. However, due to the COVID-19 pandemic, the tournament was suspended between March and September 2020, and upon its restart, all matches were relocated to centralised venues in Qatar, and the final was played at Al Janoub Stadium in Al Wakrah on 19 December 2020.

Ulsan Hyundai won their second AFC Champions League title and qualified for the 2020 FIFA Club World Cup in Qatar.

Teams
In the following table, the finals until 2002 were in the Asian Club Championship era, and since 2003 in the AFC Champions League era.

Venue
 

On 16 October 2020, the AFC announced that the final would be played in Doha, Qatar. This was the first Asian club competition final held at Al Janoub Stadium.

On 18 December 2020, the AFC announced that they had agreed with the Qatar Football Association to allow a limited number of fans to attend the match, which was the first match since restart of the tournament to have spectators.

Road to the final

Note: In all results below, the score of the finalist is given first (H: home; A: away; *: played in Qatar after restart).

Format
The final was played as a single match. If tied after regulation time, extra time and, if necessary, a penalty shoot-out would have been used to decide the winning team.

Match

Notes

References

External links
, the-AFC.com
AFC Champions League 2020, stats.the-AFC.com

2020
Final
December 2020 sports events in Asia
International club association football competitions hosted by Qatar
Persepolis F.C. matches
Ulsan Hyundai FC matches
Association football events postponed due to the COVID-19 pandemic